A list of horror films released in 2005.

References

Lists of horror films by year
2005-related lists